Geoffrey Lees (1 October 1933 – 6 June 2019) was an English professional footballer who played as a wing half.

Career
Born in Rotherham, Lees played for Barnsley and Bradford City. During his time with Bradford City he made three appearances in the Football League.

After retiring as a player, Lees worked as a youth coach at Barnsley. He died on 5 June 2019.

His father Joe Lees was also a footballer; both played for Barnsley.

Sources

References

1933 births
2019 deaths
English footballers
Barnsley F.C. players
Bradford City A.F.C. players
English Football League players
Association football wing halves
Barnsley F.C. non-playing staff
Footballers from Rotherham